Almudena Rodríguez Rodríguez (born 9 November 1993) is a Spanish female handballer for Gloria Bistrița and the Spanish national team.

Achievements 
EHF Challenge Cup:
Winner: 2016

Individual awards
 Gala Premiilor Handbalului Românesc Liga Națională Right Back of the Season: 2019

References

External links

Living people
1993 births
Spanish female handball players
Sportspeople from Las Palmas
Expatriate handball players
Spanish expatriate sportspeople in Romania
Spanish expatriate sportspeople in Germany
Competitors at the 2018 Mediterranean Games
Mediterranean Games gold medalists for Spain
Mediterranean Games medalists in handball
Handball players at the 2020 Summer Olympics